Ibrahim Nasir Rannabandeyri Kilegefan, KCMG, NGIV (Nishan Ghaazeege 'Izzatheri Veriya) (2 September 1926 – 22 November 2008) was a Maldivian politician who served as the prime minister of the Maldives 1957 to 1968 and later President from 1968 to 1978.

Early life 
Ibrahim Nasir was born in Fuvahmulah to Ahmad Didi of Velaanaage from Male' and Nayaage Aishath Didi from Fuvahmulah. Nasir is descended from the royal houses Huraa from his paternal side and Dhiyamigili from his maternal side. Nasir's mother, Aishath Didi, was the daughter of Moosa Didi, son of Dhadimagu Ganduvaru Maryam Didi, daughter of Hussain Didi, son of Al-Nabeel Karayye Hassan Didi, son of Prince Ibrahim Faamuladheyri Kilegefan, son of Sultan Muhammed Ghiya'as ud-din, son of Sultan Ibrahim Iskandar II, son of Sultan Muhammad Imaduddin II of the Dhiyamigili dynasty.

Nasir was married three times and had five children. His first wife was Aisha Zubair (Tuttudon Goma), whom he married in 1950. They had a son named Ahmed Nasir. In 1953, he married Mariyam Saeeda Didi, with whom he had two sons, Ali Nasir and Mohamed Nasir. In 1969 Nasir married Naseema Mohamed Kaleyfan, with whom he had a son and a daughter, Ismail Nasir and Aishath Nasir, respectively.

Premiership
Ibrahim Nasir served as the prime minister under the rule of Muhammad Fareed Didi from 12 December, 1957, until the former was sworn in as the first President of the Second Republic of Maldives. He was also the minister of finance from December 1957 to November 1968.

Presidency
Ibrahim Nasir, was sworn in as the second President of the independent Republic of Maldives on 11 November 1968. He was the mastermind behind the genocide in Thinadhoo. 
He was credited with many other improvements such as introducing an English-based modern curriculum to government-run schools. He brought television and radio to the country with formation of Television Maldives and Radio Maldives for broadcasting radio signals nationwide. He abolished Vaaru, a tax on the people living on islands outside Malé, as well as many other taxes on various imports to the country, some of which have been since re-instated. When Nasir relinquished power Maldives was debt-free to the international community, and corruption was effectively under control. Under his watch, the national shipping line with more than 40 ships that were plying the oceans of the world remained a source of national pride for Maldivians. It was a remarkable success story among the maritime nations of South Asia.
Nasir is considered the independence hero of the Maldives. He brought about the independence of the Maldives from being a protectorate of the British Empire. He also directed the building of the first international airport in the Maldives Malé International Airport Hulhulé International Airport

Some notable achievements during Nasir's rule:
 Attaining political independence for the country on 26 July 1965.
 Starting an English language intermediate education program (March 1961)
 Starting A-level education (1976)
 Initiating the Atoll Education Center project and opening the first center (Eydhafushi, 1977)
 Women permitted to vote in Maldives (1964)
 Starting nursing training (1963)
 Opening health centers in all atolls (starting with Naifaru, 1965)
 Opening the first modern hospital (October 1967)
 Building the first airport (April 1966)
 Starting the tourism industry (March 1972)
 First motorised fishing boat built (In Hulhule' boatyard, July 1964)
 Modernising the fisheries industry with mechanised vessels (engines became available for private fishing vessels; 1974)
 Felivaru fish canning factory opened (February 1978)
 Incorporating Maldives Shipping Limited (MSL; 1967)

Nasir was criticized for his authoritarian methods used against opponents. Most notably he was criticized for his iron-fisted methods in handling an insurrection by the people of Thinadhoo, Addu and Huvadu Atolls, who formed a breakaway government – the United Suvadives Republic – with closer ties to the British, for a brief period of time.

Nasir's hasty introduction of the Latin alphabet (Malé Latin) in 1976 instead of local Thaana script – reportedly to allow for the use of telex machines in the local administration – was widely criticised. Clarence Maloney, a Maldives-based U.S. anthropologist, lamented the inconsistencies of the "Dhivehi Latin" which ignored all previous linguistic research on the Maldivian language and did not follow the modern Standard Indic transliteration. At the time of the romanisation every island's officials were required to use only one script. The Thaana script was reinstated by President Gayoom shortly after he took power in 1978. However, Malé Latin continues to be widely used as the default romanisation of Dhivehi.

Later life
Nasir was succeeded by President Maumoon Abdul Gayoom who was then Minister of Transport and former permanent representative of the Maldives to the United States. The former president went into self-exile in Singapore on 7 December 1978 after resigning from his post. In 1981, Gayoom sentenced him to jail in absentia for alleged corruption charges and plotting a coup d'état; none of the allegations were proven and Nasir was pardoned.

Nasir was widely criticised during the Gayoom administration, especially during the early days of Gayoom's presidency. There were massive rallies in almost all the big islands of Maldives with indecent cartoons of Nasir organized by Gayoom's government, as well as cartoons of Nasir on the roads and in newspapers. Insulting anti-Nasir songs were recorded and distributed by the government, which were even played on national radio.

It is said that until Nasir left Malé, Gayoom praised and talked in favour of him (as in his first speech after being sworn in as president). However, after Nasir left Malé everything changed. Mass demonstrations were held against him, labeling him a traitor, and calling for his death. He was tried in absentia and sentenced. Gayoom himself led a massive demonstration against Nasir on 16 May 1980 and the 'crowd' to which Gayoom spoke (between 15,000 and 20,000 people attended, with the population of Malé then being about 35,000) in which he discussed his views about how Nasir came to power, how he had been one of the leaders in the overthrow of first president Mohamed Ameen in 1953 and how he had allegedly mishandled government money. However, the allegations against Nasir were never proven. Gayoom later pardoned him in July 1990, but never granted permission for him to return to Maldives. This point turned out to be proven according to an interview given by Kuvaa Mohamed Maniku, a close associate of Nasir to TVM on 23 November 2008, one day after Nasir's death. Maniku said he met President Nasir at Bangkok Airport in 1990 after Nasir had been pardoned by the government, and Nasir had told Maniku he had sent a letter to President Gayoom requesting permission to return to Maldives and to live anywhere in the country approved by him. According to Maniku, Nasir had told him that he had not received a reply from Gayoom.

Death

On 22 November 2008, at the age of 82, Nasir died at Mount Elizabeth Hospital in Singapore. Though the cause of death is unknown, he had kidney problems which plagued him in the time before his death. Nasir's body was flown to the Maldives, where his body was displayed in Theemuge, the presidential palace in Malé, on 23 November. The day was declared a national holiday in the Maldives, and tens of thousands of Maldivians flocked to see Nasir's body. At the presidential palace, former President Mohamed Nasheed were among those who paid their respects to Nasir. His funeral prayer was led by Dr. 'Abdul Majeed 'Abdul-Bari after the Fajr (dawn) prayers on Monday, 24 November 2008. After the funeral prayers, Nasir was laid to rest at dawn at the cemetery attached to the Friday Mosque (Hukuru Miskkiy). Nasir was survived by three children, Ahmed Nasir, Ismail Nasir and Aishath Nasir. His other two sons, Ali Nasir and Muhamed Nasir, had predeceased their father by several years.

References

External Links 

|-

|-

1926 births
2008 deaths
Knights Commander of the Order of St Michael and St George
Presidents of the Maldives
Recipients of Maldivian presidential pardons
Prime Ministers of the Maldives
Finance ministers of the Maldives
Maldivian Muslims
Deaths in Singapore